Tahmasebi is an Iranian surname that may refer to
Amir Abdollah Tahmasebi (1881–1928), Iranian military commander
Bahman Tahmasebi (born 1980), Iranian football striker
Khalil Tahmasebi (died 1955), Iranian Islamist
Mohammad Reza Tahmasebi (born 1976), Iranian football player 
Saman Tahmasebi (born 1985), Iranian-Azerbaijani wrestler

See also
Nowtarki-ye Tahmasebi, a village in Iran